The following is the qualification system for the triathlon at the 2019 Pan American Games event and qualified athletes/quotas.

Qualification system
A total of 70 triathletes (35 per gender) will qualify to compete. A nation may enter a maximum of 6 triathletes (three per gender). The host nation (Peru) automatically qualified four athletes (two per gender). All other nations qualified through various qualifying tournaments and rankings. A further three invitational slots, per gender, were also awarded. A maximum five nations could enter the maximum of 6 triathletes.

The top placed mixed relay team at the 2018 South American Games and 2018 Central American and Caribbean Games each qualified two athletes per gender. The top five teams not qualified at the Pan American Mixed Relays Championship also qualified two quotas per gender. The rest of the slots were awarded through the ITU World Ranking as of April 30, 2019 and through wild card slots. An athlete could not earn more than one slot for their country.

A country may enter the mixed relay competition if it has qualified at least two male and two female triathletes.

Qualification timeline

Qualification summary

Qualification progress

Only three teams that were eligible earned spots at the Pan American Mixed Relay Championships.

References

External links
2018 South American Games mixed relay results
2018 Central American and Caribbean Games mixed relay results
2018 Pan American Mixed Relays Championship results

P
P
Qualification for the 2019 Pan American Games
Triathlon at the 2019 Pan American Games